Ayao is an orisha in the Santería pantheon. She is the orisha of the air. Ayao is considered to reside in both the forest and in the eye of the tornado. She works closely with Osain and is a fierce warrior. Ayao has among her implements a crossbow with a serpent, a quill, and nine stones. She is commonly placed next to her sister, Oya. Her colors are brown and green. Ayao's cult was thought to be lost among various adherents; however, a growing number of olorichas have her in their possession. 

Yoruba goddesses
Wind deities